Neue Deutsche Biographie (NDB; literally New German Biography) is a biographical reference work. It is the successor to the Allgemeine Deutsche Biographie (ADB, Universal German Biography). The 26 volumes published thus far cover more than 22,500 individuals and families who lived in the German language area.

NDB is published in German by the Historical Commission at the Bavarian Academy of Sciences and Humanities and printed by Duncker & Humblot in Berlin. The index and full-text articles of the first 25 volumes are freely available online via the website German Biography (Deutsche Biographie) and the Biographical Portal.

Scope
NDB is a comprehensive reference work, similar to Dictionary of National Biography, Dictionary of American Biography, American National Biography, Dictionary of Canadian Biography, Dictionary of Australian Biography, Dictionary of New Zealand Biography, Diccionario Biográfico Español, Dictionary of Irish Biography, Svenskt biografiskt lexikon, and Österreichisches Biographisches Lexikon 1815-1950 (ÖBL) (Austrian Biographical Dictionary 1815–1950).

Its first volume, alphabetically covering names from "Aachen" to "Behaim", was published in 1953. As of 2016, the most recent volume is the 26th, covering names from "Tecklenburg" to "Vocke", which was published in October 2016. So far, more than 22,500 biographies of individuals and families, who lived in the German language area (Sprachraum), have been published. Some 1,600 further articles will be added in two further volumes, with completion expected in 2021.

An NDB article usually contains genealogical information such as date and place of birth, date and place of death, tomb, parents, grandparents, marriages, divorces, number of children, alternate and birth names, academic degrees, a curriculum vitae in whole sentences, a valuation of the subject's political, economic, social, scientific, technical or artistic achievements, a bibliography and references to portraits. Only deceased persons with a close relation to the German language area are recorded. Each article is signed by its author.

Access
An index cataloguing all articles and the full text of articles in the first 26 volumes, covering names from "Aachen" to "Vocke", is freely available online. The index is also part of the Biographie-Portal (Biographical Portal). This cooperative project of the Bavarian State Library (Bayerische Staatsbibliothek), the Historical Commission at the Bavarian Academy of Sciences and Humanities (Historische Kommission bei der Bayerischen Akademie der Wissenschaften), the Austrian Academy of Sciences and Humanities (Österreichische Akademie der Wissenschaften) the Foundation Historical Dictionary of Switzerland, and Slovenian Academy of Sciences and Arts also makes available data of Allgemeine Deutsche Biographie (ADB), Österreichisches Biographisches Lexikon 1815-1950 (ÖBL) (Austrian Biographical Dictionary 1815–1950), Historisches Lexikon der Schweiz / Dictionnaire Historique de la Suisse / Dizionario Storico della Svizzera (HLS / DHS / DSS), Rheinland-Pfälzische Personendatenbank (RPPB), Sächsische Biografie (Saxon Biography), and Oesterreichisches Musiklexikon (OeML).

Volumes

Aachen – Behaim. 1953, reprint 1971
Behaim – Bürkel. 1955, reprint 1971
Bürklein – Ditmar. 1957, reprint 1971
Dittel – Falck. 1959, reprint 1971
Falck - Fyner (voran: Faistenberger). 1961, reprint 1971
Gaál – Grasmann. 1964, reprint 1971
Grassauer – Hartmann. 1966
Hartmann – Heske. 1969
Heß – Hüttig. 1972
Hufeland – Kaffsack. 1974
Kafka – Kleinfercher. 1977
Kleinhans – Kreling. 1980
Krell – Laven. 1982
Laverrenz - Locher-Freuler. 1985
Locherer - Maltza(h)n. 1987 
Maly – Melanchthon. 1990 
Melander – Moller. 1994 
Moller – Nausea. 1997 
Nauwach – Pagel. 1999 
Pagenstecher – Püterich. 2001 
Pütter – Rohlfs. Mit ADB & NDB-Gesamtregister auf CD-ROM. 2003 
Rohmer – Schinkel. Mit ADB & NDB-Gesamtregister auf CD-ROM, second edition. 2005 
Schinzel - Schwarz. Mit ADB & NDB-Gesamtregister auf CD-ROM, third edition. 2007 
Schwarz – Stader. Mit ADB & NDB-Gesamtregister auf CD-ROM, fourth edition. 2010 
Stadion - Tecklenborg. 2013 
Tecklenburg - Vocke. 2016  
Vockerodt - Wettiner. 2020

Publication details 
 Neue deutsche Biographie / herausgegeben von der Historischen Kommission bei der Bayerischen Akademie der Wissenschaften. Berlin : Duncker & Humblot, since 1953. .

See also
 Allgemeine Deutsche Biographie
 Deutsche Biographie
 Biographical Portal

References
 Reinert, Matthias, Schrott, Maximilian, Ebneth, Bernhard, Rehbein, Malte, Team Deutsche Biographie et al., From Biographies to Data Curation: The Making of www.deutsche-biographie.de, in: BD2015. Biographical Data in a Digital World. Proceedings of the First Conference on Biographical Data in a Digital World 2015. Amsterdam, The Netherlands, April 9, 2015, ed. by. Serge ter Braake, Antske Fokkens, Ronald Sluijter, Thierry Declerck, Eveline Wandl-Vogt, CEUR Workshop Proceedings Vol-1399. pp. 13–19.

External links
 German Biography (Deutsche Biographie)—complete full-text articles, index and further information
 Biographical Portal (Biographie-Portal)—complete index
 Neue Deutsche Biographie
 Neue Deutsche Biographie (Duncker & Humblot)
 Historische Kommission bei der Bayerischen Akademie der Wissenschaften
 Munich Digitisation Centre, Digital Library department of the Bavarian State Library

1953 non-fiction books
German biographical dictionaries
Online person databases